Marcus Harrison (born July 10, 1984) is a former American football defensive tackle. He was drafted by the Chicago Bears in the third round of the 2008 NFL Draft after playing college football at Arkansas.

Early years

Harrison played high school football at Mills High School in Little Rock.  After a successful career as an Arkansas Razorback, Harrison stepped up for the Chicago Bears and had a productive rookie season, rotating in and playing extensively alongside Tommie Harris.

Professional career
On September 4, 2011, Harrison was claimed off waivers by the Carolina Panthers. However, he failed his physical and was placed back on waivers.

On October 14, Harrison was signed by the New England Patriots, and to make room, the Patriots released Phillip Adams. He was released on October 15, 2011.

External links
Arkansas Razorbacks bio
Chicago Bears bio

1984 births
Living people
Sportspeople from Little Rock, Arkansas
Players of American football from Arkansas
American football defensive tackles
Arkansas Razorbacks football players
Chicago Bears players
New England Patriots players